The Genoa Saint George Bridge is a motorway viaduct that crosses the Polcevera river and the districts of Sampierdarena and Cornigliano, in the city of Genoa. It was designed by architect Renzo Piano.

The bridge replaces the Ponte Morandi (Polcevera Viaduct), which partially collapsed on 14 August 2018 and was demolished in June 2019.

The new viaduct, with its associated junctions, constitutes the initial section of the Italian A10 motorway, managed by the concessionaire Autostrade per l'Italia, which in turn is included in the European route E80.

The new bridge was inaugurated on 3 August 2020.

Features 
The bridge project was carried out by the Genoese architect Renzo Piano through his Building Workshop and was officially presented on 7 September 2018 together with the President of Liguria Giovanni Toti, the Mayor of Genoa Marco Bucci and the CEOs of Autostrade per l'Italia and Fincantieri, Giovanni Castellucci and Giuseppe Bono respectively. The project includes four lanes and two emergency lanes.

The viaduct will be constantly monitored by four robots (designed by the Istituto Italiano di Tecnologia) equipped with wheels (with which they will move along the external rails of the viaduct) and articulated arms. The role of these robots is to automate inspection of the lower surface of the bridge and the cleaning of windproof barriers and solar panels.

Construction 
On 18 December 2018, the two companies Salini Impregilo and Fincantieri were awarded the contract for the construction of the bridge. At a cost of 202 million euros and to be built in a year with the development of the executive design entrusted to Italferr while the direction and supervision, the demolition and construction of the new bridge was entrusted to the RINA certification company for 14 million euros.

On 25 June 2019, the first stone was officially laid with the casting of the base of pile 9 in the presence of various authorities.

The casting of the concrete slab began on 6 June 2020, an operation completed in about ten days.

On 21 July 2020, the mayor of Genoa Marco Bucci made official the name of the bridge and its inauguration for 3 August 2020.

Almost between mourning and joy the newest bridge in Genoa was inaugurated with honors to Italian President Sergio Mattarella and other authorities present, the last wishes delivered in a speech by the architect Renzo Piano.

See also 
 Polcevera
 Val Polcevera

References

External links 
 
 
 
 
 
 
 
 

Concrete bridges
Bridges completed in 2020
Steel bridges
Renzo Piano buildings
Coordinates not on Wikidata
Buildings and structures in Genoa
Transport in Genoa
Bridges in Genoa